Ingeborg Roelofs (born 27 November 1983, in Breukelen) is a Dutch team handball player. She plays on the Dutch national team, and participated at the 2011 World Women's Handball Championship in Brazil.

References

1983 births
Living people
Dutch female handball players
People from Breukelen
Sportspeople from Utrecht (province)
21st-century Dutch women